is a Japanese anime television and film director, best known for directing the critically acclaimed and commercially successful anime series Cowboy Bebop and Samurai Champloo. An auteur of the industry, Watanabe's work is characterized by evocative uses of music, mature themes, and the incorporation of multiple genres.

Career
Watanabe was born in Kyoto. After joining the Japanese animation studio Sunrise, he supervised the episode direction and storyboards of numerous Sunrise anime, and soon made his directorial debut as co-director of the well-received Macross update, Macross Plus. His next effort, and first full directorial venture, was the 1998 series Cowboy Bebop, which received universal praise and is considered by many to be one of the greatest anime series of all time. It was followed by the 2001 film Knockin' on Heaven's Door. In 2003, Watanabe directed his first American-produced anime, the short films Kid's Story and A Detective Story, both part of The Wachowskis' The Animatrix, an anthology of animated short stories from The Matrix. His next directorial effort was the critically acclaimed 2004 anime series Samurai Champloo which began broadcasting on Fuji Television in Japan on May 19, 2004.

Following the release of Samurai Champloo, Watanabe directed a short film called Baby Blue, which was released on July 7, 2007 as a segment of the anthology film Genius Party. In recent years, he has been active as a creative music producer, overseeing the 2004 film Mind Game, 2008's Michiko & Hatchin, and supervising the storyboards for episode 12 of Tetsuwan Birdy: Decode. In 2012, he directed the anime series Kids on the Slope (Japanese title: Sakamichi no Apollon), a coming-of-age story about young jazz musicians, which premiered in April 2012 on Fuji TV's Noitamina block.

In 2009, it was announced that Watanabe would be working as an associate producer on the upcoming live-action adaptation of Cowboy Bebop, alongside his fellow Sunrise staff members Kenji Uchida and Keiko Nobumoto. During FicZone in Granada, Spain, it was reported that Watanabe was collaborating with anime studio BONES on a space science-fiction comedy. BONES subsequently confirmed that the studio was working with Watanabe, but did not confirm the genre of the series. In late 2013, the original trailers for Space Dandy were released to the public. The dubbed version premiered on Adult Swim on its Toonami block on January 4, 2014 in the United States, hours before airing in Japan. He is frequently ranked among Japan's best animation directors.

Watanabe directed the anime short film Blade Runner Black Out 2022, which was released in 2017. On November 29, 2018, it was announced that he would be creative producer of Blade Runner: Black Lotus, an anime series produced for Adult Swim and Crunchyroll.

He received an associate producer credit on the Netflix adaptation of Cowboy Bebop but wasn´t involved in its production and criticized it after its release.

Works

Television productions
As director
Macross Plus (1994)
Cowboy Bebop (1998)
Samurai Champloo (2004)
Kids on the Slope (2012)
Space Dandy (2014, chief director)
Terror in Resonance (2014)
Carole & Tuesday (2019, chief director)

Other
The Vision of Escaflowne (1996; episode director (5, 8), storyboard artist (5, 8, 12, 16))
Ergo Proxy (2006; storyboard artist (19))
Tetsuwan Birdy DECODE (2008; storyboard artist (12), episode director (12))
Michiko to Hatchin (2008; music producer)
Lupin the Third: The Woman Called Fujiko Mine (2012; music producer)
Death Parade (2015; unit director (ED))
Sonny Boy (2021; music advisor)
Blade Runner: Black Lotus (2021; creative director)

Films
Macross Plus: Movie Edition (1995; director)
Cowboy Bebop: Knockin' on Heaven's Door (2001; director)
The Animatrix (2003; director, "Detective's Story", "Kid's Story")
Mind Game (2004; music producer)
Genius Party (omnibus): Baby Blue (2008; director)
Blade Runner Black Out 2022 (2017; director)

Music videos
"More" (featuring Anderson .Paak) – Flying Lotus (2019; director)

Use of music
Cowboy Bebop is heavily influenced by American culture, especially the jazz movements of the 1940s, hence the title "bebop". This style is blended with a score by the prolific composer Yoko Kanno featuring jazz, blues and funk music. The anachronistic soundtrack of Samurai Champloo, though an Edo period piece, draws heavily from hip hop music,  while the later series Kids on the Slope demonstrates many classical forms of jazz, and Space Dandy draws from primarily new wave music. His series, Terror in Resonance, utilizes post-rock and ambient music influenced by Icelandic band Sigur Rós. His series Carole and Tuesday is based entirely off of the bonds made by music.

References

External links

 

Sunrise (company) people
1965 births
Anime directors
Japanese film directors
Japanese television directors
Japanese animated film directors
Japanese animated film producers
Japanese music video directors
Japanese animators
Living people
People from Kyoto